Pontarlier Airport  is a French municipal airport located near Pontarlier in the department of Doubs, region of Franche-Comté, 400 km southeast of Paris. It is managed by the town of Pontarlier, and is open to the public.

The land around Pontarlier Airport is hilly in the east and flat in the west. The highest part is located 6.4 km east of Pontarlier Airport, and has an elevation of 1,275 meters above sea level. The area around the airport has a population density of 56 people per square kilometer.

The average temperature here is 6 °C . The warmest month is August, at 18  °C , and the coldest is January, at −6 °C.  The average rainfall is 1,810 millimeters per year. The wettest month is July, with 214 millimeters of rain, and the driest is March, with 64 millimeters.

Tenants
 Pontarlier Aéroclub (flying lessons) 
 Ultralight Club
 SE Aviation

External links
 Airport official website

Notes and references 

Airports in Bourgogne-Franche-Comté
Buildings and structures in Doubs
Airports established in 1930